Chae Sang-woo (born March 31, 1999) is a South Korean actor. He began his acting career in 2008 as a child actor, notably in Deep Rooted Tree (2011).

Filmography

Film
Wretches (2018) - Jo Seong-woo
The Huntresses (2014) - Sa-hyun
The Face Reader (2013) - Danjong
Wedding Dress (2010) - Min-woo

Television series
The Nokdu Flower (2019) - Yi Seong-gye
Money Flower (2017) - young Jang Boo-cheon
The Producers (2015) - young Ra Joon-mo	
Unkind Ladies (2015) - Gook Young-soo
The Suspicious Housekeeper (2013) - Eun Du-gyeom
The Eldest (2013) - young Park Soon-taek
The Blade and Petal (2013)- young Yeon Choong	
Jang Ok-jung, Living by Love (SBS, 2013) - young Sukjong
King of Ambition (2013)- young Ha Ryu / Cha Jae-woong	
Dream of the Emperor (2012) - young Gim Chunchu
Insu, the Queen Mother (2011) - Danjong
Deep Rooted Tree (2011) - young Kang Chae-yoon
City Hunter (2011) - young Lee Yun-sung
49 Days (2011) - young Song Yi-soo
Midas (2011) - young Kim Do-hyun
More Charming by the Day (2010) - Kim Jun
Father's House (2009) - Han Ban-do
High Kick Through the Roof (2009, cameo) - Puppeteer addict
Swallow the Sun (2009) 
Windy City (2008) - Phillip Jo
My Sweet Seoul (2008) - Sedol
Sweaty Martyr Tak-deok Choi Yang-eop (2008) - Woo-jung

Web series 
 Revenge of Others (2022) - Ki Oh-seong

TV show
신나라 과학나라 (2009)

Theater
Dead Poets Society (Inha University, 2021)

References

External links

21st-century South Korean male actors
South Korean male child actors
Living people
1999 births
South Korean male film actors
South Korean male television actors

People from Cheorwon County